Gerrit Parmele Judd (April 23, 1803 – July 12, 1873) was an American physician and missionary to the Kingdom of Hawaii who later renounced his American citizenship and became a trusted advisor and cabinet minister to King Kamehameha III. 

He married missionary and historian Laura Fish Judd in 1827.

Life 
Judd was born April 23, 1803, in Paris, Oneida County, New York, the son of Elnathan Judd and his wife Betsey Hastings. On his mother's side, he was descended from Thomas Hastings, who came from the East Anglian area of England to the Massachusetts Bay Colony in 1634.  He received his middle name in honor of his maternal grandmother, Eunice Parmele.

He was educated as a physician at the medical college in Fairfield, New York. He married Laura Fish (1804–1872) on September 20, 1827, in Clinton, Oneida County, New York.
The couple sailed to Hawaii (then known as the 'Sandwich Islands') that same year, on the ship Parthian, the third company from the American Board of Commissioners for Foreign Missions.
He was assigned to the mission at Honolulu on the island of Oahu, as a missionary physician, and continued in that employment fifteen years.

Work
In 1842 he resigned from the mission and became an advisor and translator to King Kamehameha III.
He also became involved in the civil concerns of the islands, and was the King’s Minister of Foreign Affairs from November 1843 to March 1845, Minister of Interior from March 1845 to February 1846, Minister of Finance from April 1846 to September 1853, and in the House of Representatives from 1858 to 1859. He was commissioned in 1849 as Minister Plenipotentiary to England, France and the United States.

He was one of the founders of the Punahou School for children of the missionaries in 1841. He founded Hawaii's first medical school in 1870, and was the author of one of the first medical texts written in Hawaiian, in 1838.

In 1850 Judd purchased from King Kamehameha the land which became the Kualoa Ranch on the Windward Coast of Oahu.  His descendants still own and operate the ranch today.

Judd died July 12, 1873, in Honolulu and was buried in the Oahu Cemetery.

Family
Judd and his wife Laura had nine children: 
Gerrit Parmele II born March 8, 1829, died November 13, 1839, buried in Oahu Cemetery.
Elizabeth Kinau born July 5, 1831, died August 21, 1918. Married September 29, 1857, to Samuel Gardner Wilder (1831–1888) from Leominster, Massachusetts, six children.
Helen Seymour born August 27, 1833, and died April 2, 1911.
Charles Hastings born September 8, 1835 (twin) died April 18, 1890. Married November 1, 1859, to Emily Catherine Cutts (1840–1921), four children. Worked in the Guano and farming businesses, and  held several posts in the Kingdom.
Laura Fish born September 8, 1835 (twin) died November 22, 1888, at San Francisco, California. Married February 22, 1861, to Joshua Gill Dickson (1830–1880), four children.
Albert Francis born January 7, 1838, died May 20, 1900. Married April 4, 1872, to Agnes Hall Boyd (1844–1934) nine children. Last child Lawrence M. Judd became Governor of the Territory of Hawaii in 1929–1934.
Allan Wilkes born April 20, 1841, and died March 26, 1875. 
Sybil Augusta born March 16, 1843, and died September 1, 1904. Married February 27, 1862, to Henry Alpheus Peirce Carter (1837–1891), seven children. Son Charles Lunt was a member of the Committee of Safety, and son George Robert was Governor of the Territory of Hawaii (1903–1907).
Juliet Isabelle "Julie" born March 28, 1846, and died June 27, 1857.

Legacy
Judd's life was the basis of the novel The White King.  A biography, Dr. Judd, Hawaii’s Friend which was written by his great-grandson Gerrit P. Judd IV (1915–1971) and published in 1960. His papers were kept under restricted access at the Bishop Museum until his great-grandson Albert Francis Judd III died in 2006.

Judd Street in Honolulu is named in his honour.

Publications

References

Further reading

Buckminster, Lydia N.H., The Hastings Memorial, A Genealogical Account of the Descendants of Thomas Hastings of Watertown, Mass. from 1634 to 1864, Boston: Samuel G. Drake Publisher (an undated NEHGS photoduplicate of the 1866 edition).
Judd IV, Gerrit P., Dr. Judd, Hawaii's friend, A biography of Gerrit Parmele Judd (1803–1873), Honolulu: University of Hawaii Press, 1960.

External links
 Descendants of Thomas Hastings website

1803 births
1873 deaths
American Protestant missionaries
Christian medical missionaries
Congregationalist missionaries in Hawaii
Hawaiian Kingdom Foreign Ministers
Members of the Hawaiian Kingdom House of Nobles
Hawaiian Kingdom Interior Ministers
Members of the Hawaiian Kingdom Privy Council
Hawaiian Kingdom Finance Ministers
Members of the Hawaiian Kingdom House of Representatives
People from Paris, New York
Burials at Oahu Cemetery
Ambassadors of the Hawaiian Kingdom
American emigrants to the Hawaiian Kingdom
Politicians from Honolulu
Judd family